Aninoasa Coal Mine is an underground mining exploitation, one of the largest in Romania located in Aninoasa in the south-western part of the country in Hunedoara County. The legal entity managing the Aninoasa mine is the National Hard Coal Company which was set up in 1998. The mine has reserves of 70.7 million tonnes of coal and annual production amounts to 0.4 million tonnes.

See also
 Jiu Valley
 League of Miners Unions of the Jiu Valley

External links
 Coal mines and coal mining in Jiu Valley

References

Coal mines in Romania